Alan Ormsby (born December 14, 1943) is an American director, screenwriter, make up artist, actor and author.

Film career
Ormsby began work in feature films with the Bob Clark-directed Children Shouldn't Play with Dead Things (1972), which co-starred his then-wife Anya Ormsby. In addition to writing the film's script, Ormsby played the lead, Alan, and provided the film's make-up effects. Two years later, Ormsby and Clark re-teamed on Deathdream.

Deranged, a horror film inspired by serial killer Ed Gein, saw Clark producing with Ormsby writing and co-directing the feature (with Jeff Gillen), while Deathdream saw Clark directing another Ormsby script. In 1980s Ormsby continued as a screenwriter, writing the screenplays for My Bodyguard (1980), The Little Dragons (1980), Paul Schrader's Cat People (1982) and Clark's Porky's II: The Next Day (1983). Ormsby returned to directing with Popcorn (1991). Written by Ormsby, the film production saw him leave the director's chair early on, to be replaced by Porky's actor Mark Herrier. In the early 90s, he was brought on board to write the screenplay for a remake of The Mummy for Joe Dante, who praised it, but later hired John Sayles to rewrite the script in November 1993. In 1996, he co-wrote The Substitute, which became a successful series of films.

Other works
In addition to his work in film, Ormsby is known for having authored the 1970s special make-up effects book Movie Monsters.  He also created the popular doll Hugo: Man of a Thousand Faces, which would be featured on The Pee-wee Herman Show and Uncle Floyd's variety show.

References

External links
 
 

1943 births
Living people
American film directors
American male film actors
American male screenwriters
American make-up artists
American non-fiction writers
Place of birth missing (living people)
American male non-fiction writers